Ferrocenecarboxylic acid is the organoiron compound with the formula .  It is the simplest carboxylic acid derivative of ferrocene.  It can be prepared in two steps from ferrocene by acylation with a 2-chlorobenzoyl chloride followed by hydrolysis.

Reactions and derivatives
The pKa of ferrocenecarboxylic acid is 7.8.  The acidity increases more than a thousand-fold, to pH 4.54 upon oxidation to the ferrocenium cation.

By treatment with thionyl chloride, the carboxylic acid anhydride is produced.

Derivatives of ferrocenecarboxylic acid are components of some redox switches.

Related compounds
 1,1'-Ferrocenedicarboxylic acid

References

Ferrocenes
Cyclopentadienyl complexes
Carboxylic acids